In rhetoric, protrepsis and paraenesis (παραίνεσις) are two closely related styles of exhortation that are employed by moral philosophers.  While there is a widely accepted distinction between the two that is employed by modern writers, classical philosophers did not make a clear distinction between the two, and even used them interchangeably.

Differences

In antiquity
Clement of Alexandria differentiated between protrepsis and paraenesis in his Paedagogus.  Other writers, however, both before and after him, conflated the two.  Pseudo-Justin's protrepsis is entitled an Paraenetic Address to the Greeks and Magnus Felix Ennodius' Paraenesis didascalia is actually in the style of protrepsis.

In modernity
The modern distinction between the two ideas, as generally used in modern scholarship, is explained by Stanley Stowers thus:

In other words, the distinction often employed by modern writers is that protrepsis is conversion literature, where a philosopher aims to convert outsiders to following a particular philosophical path, whereas paraenesis is aimed at those who already follow that path, giving them advice on how best to follow it.  This is not a universally-held distinction.  Swancutt, observing Stowers' recognition that the two ideas were not formally distinguished in this way by classical philosophers, argues, for example, that the modern distinction is a false dichotomy that originated with Paul Hartlich's De Exhortationum a Graecis Romanisque scriptarum historia et indole, published in 1889.

Classical writers' perspectives differed from the modern view.  For example: Malherbe's explanation of Epictetus' view of protrepsis (as set out in the third of his Discourses) is:

Malherbe defines paraenesis as being "broader in scope than protrepsis", and as "moral exhortation in which someone is advised to pursue or abstain from something".  Its formal characteristics include the occurrence of phrases such as "as you know", indicating that the speaker is covering ground that is not new to the listener, but that is considered traditional and already known.  The speaker is not instructing the listener, but rather reminding.  Other formal characteristics include compliments for already adhering to what is exhorted, encouragement to continue in the same fashion, an example (often delineated antithetically and usually a family member, particularly the speaker's father).

List of works

There have been many writers of protreptics in the ancient world, including: 

Theophrastus
Antisthenes
Aristo of Chios
Cleanthes
Persaeus of Citium
Epicurus
Chrysippus of Soli
Posidonius
Augustus
Seneca
Musonius Rufus
Epictetus
Galen
Lesbonax of Mytilene
Clement of Alexandria
Themistius

See also

Protrepticus (Aristotle)
Protrepticus (Clement)
Hortensius (Cicero)

References 

Rhetorical techniques
Ethics